Dario Cabanelas Rodríguez, born in Trasalba, Ourense, Spain, December 20, 1916, and died there, September 18, 1992, may be considered one of the most important Spanish Arabists of the 20th century.

After studying baccalaureate, philosophy and theology in Santiago de Compostela, he was ordained as a priest into the Franciscan Religious Order on June 23, 1940. Since 1942, he studied philosophy and humanities, Section of Semitic Philology, at Central University, called today Complutense University, in Madrid, with Extraordinary Degree Award, and he got the doctorate on June 15, 1948, about the topic Juan de Segovia y el problema islámico, with a Special Award Doctorate. He was a holder of a scholarship and a collaborator at Miguel Asín Palacios Institute of Spanish National Research Council. He taught Arabic language and literature at the Complutense University of Madrid and from 1955 was Professor at the University of Granada. He was a disciple of Emilio García Gómez, he trained a lot of professionals during four generations for more than forty years. His scientific contributions are very extensive: he wrote over 100 works, among books, articles, bibliographical reviews and reports, as well as being director of 18 doctorates, 26 master dissertations, etcetera, and lectured on the Arab and Islamic world in Spain and abroad. He specialized mainly in Arabic linguistics, literature and philosophy, and among his most outstanding works are his writings on Ibn Sida and Alonso del Castillo. Furthermore, he occupied high academic places and dignities, such as Dean of the Faculty of Philosophy and Humanities in Granada (1965-1968), Director of Department of Arabic in Granada (1972-1987), Director of the School of Arabic Studies of Spanish National Research Council in Granada (1972-1984), Membership of Royal Academy of Fine Arts in Granada (1977-1992), President of Alhambra and Generalife Council's Publications Commission (1978-1985), Membership "al honorem" of Institute for Cooperation with the Arab World of the Foreign Office in Spain (1979-1992) and others. Retired in 1985, he was named in 1987 Professor Emeritus of the University of Granada.

References

External links
 https://archive.today/20130213161858/http://www.marcialpons.es/libros/juan-de-segovia-y-el-problema-islamico/9788433845344/
 http://www.ateneodecordoba.com/index.php/Dar%C3%ADo_Cabanelas_Rodr%C3%ADguez
 http://www.alhambra-patronato.es/ria/browse?value=Dar%C3%ADo+Cabanelas+Rodriguez&type=subject
 http://digibug.ugr.es/handle/10481/18697
 http://digibug.ugr.es/bitstream/10481/2549/1/Zv1-Torres.05.pdf
 http://www.iberlibro.com/servlet/SearchResults?an=cabanelas&sortby=17&sts=t&tn=juan+de+segovia&x=71&y=16
 http://www.granada.cehgr.es/quienes-somos/historia
 http://bddoc.csic.es:8080/detalles.html?tabla=docu&bd=LITTERA&id=312925
 http://digibug.ugr.es/browse?type=author&order=ASC&rpp=100&value=Cabanelas%2C+Dar%C3%ADo

1916 births
1992 deaths
Academic staff of the University of Granada
Spanish Arabists
Spanish orientalists
Spanish literary historians
20th-century Spanish Roman Catholic priests
Christian scholars of Islam
20th-century Spanish historians
20th-century Spanish male writers